Qaradağlı (also, Karadagly) is a village and municipality in the Agdam Rayon of Azerbaijan.  It has a population of 4,832.  The municipality consists of the villages of Qaradağlı, Rzalar, and Evoğlu.

References 

Populated places in Aghdam District